Walter Valdi (stage name of Walter Pinnetti; 20 August 1930 – 13 October 2003) was an Italian singer, songwriter, author and actor of several songs and theatrical pieces in Milanese Dialect.

He was born in Cavenago Brianza and died in Milan.

1930 births
2003 deaths
People from the Province of Monza e Brianza
Italian male actors
20th-century Italian  male singers